Kurkudym is a Ukrainian surname. Notable people with the surname include:

 Tetyana Kurkudym (born 1980), Ukrainian ice dancer
 Vitali Kurkudym (born 1977), Ukrainian ice dancer

See also
 

Ukrainian-language surnames